Vijayaditya I (died 1175) was a king of the Shilahara dynasty. He joined in a conspiracy which was being formed by Bijjala, a minister of his feudal Lord Taila III, and in the revolution that ensued the Chalukya supremacy came to an end circa 1153ad. The Satara plates of his son claim that Vijayaditya I reinstated the fallen lords of Sthanaka and Goa. He was the senior contemporary of Basava and other Shivasharanas. Vijayaditya I  had to fight hard to wrest independence from Kalachuri Bijjala, the new sovereign but it was only after the death of Bijjala after the Kalyana revolution in 1168ad, that Vijayaditya I could assume full sovereignty.

See also
 Shilahara

References
 Bhandarkar R.G. (1957): Early History of Deccan, Sushil Gupta (I) Pvt Ltd, Calcutta.
 Fleet J.F (1896) :The Dynasties of the Kanarese District of The Bombay Presidency, Written for the Bombay Gazetteer .
 Department of Gazetteer, Govt of Maharashtra (2002) : Itihaas : Prachin Kal, Khand -1 (Marathi)
 Department of Gazetteer, Govt of Maharashtra (1960) : Kolhapur District Gazetteer
 Department of Gazetteer, Govt of Maharashtra (1964) : Kolaba District Gazetteer
 Department of Gazetteer, Govt of Maharashtra (1982) : Thane District Gazetteer
 A.S.Altekar (1936) : The Silaharas of Western India

External links
 Silver Coin of Shilaharas of Southern Maharashtra (Coinex 2006 - Souvenir)

Shilahara dynasty